Jalan Pagoh–Parit Sulong (Johor state route J23) is a major road in Johor, Malaysia.

List of interchanges

Roads in Johor